Asthena livida is a moth in the family Geometridae. It is found in India.

References

Moths described in 1896
Asthena
Moths of Asia